Lateiner is a surname. Notable people with the surname include:

Joseph Lateiner (1853–1935), Yiddish language playwright
Jacob Lateiner (1928–2010), Cuban-American pianist
Isidor Lateiner (1930–2005), Cuban-American violinist
Sarah Lateiner, American technical educator